General elections were held in Cuba on 1 November 1954. Fulgencio Batista won the presidential election running under the National Progressive Coalition banner, whilst the main opposition candidate, Ramón Grau, withdrew his candidacy before election day. Progressive Action Party emerged as the largest party in the House of Representatives, winning 60 of the 130 seats. Voter turnout was 52.4%.

Results

President

Senate

House of Representatives

Notes

References

Cuba
General
One-party elections
Presidential elections in Cuba
Parliamentary elections in Cuba
Cuba
Election and referendum articles with incomplete results